Arogyaswami J. Paulraj   (born 14 April 1944) is an Indian-American electrical engineer, academic. He is a Professor Emeritus in the Dept. of Elect. Engg. at Stanford University.

Early life 
Paulraj was born in Pollachi near Coimbatore, British India in 1944, one of six children of Sinappan Arogyaswami and his wife Rose. He attended Montfort Boys' High School in Yercaud, Tamil Nadu. He joined the Indian Navy at age 15 through the National Defense Academy, Khadakvasla and served the Indian Navy for 26 years. Paulraj received a B.E. in electrical engineering from the Naval College of Engineering, Lonavala, India, and  a Ph.D. in electrical engineering from the Indian Institute of Technology, New Delhi, India

Career in India 
Paulraj's contributions in India came whilst serving in the Indian Navy. In 1972, he developed new electronics for a British origin Sonar 170B. The technology was widely deployed in the Indian fleet. During 1977- 83, Paulraj led the development of a large surface ship sonar  APSOH. This became the fleet sonar for the Indian Navy and its variants are still widely deployed. APSOH was a landmark achievement in Indian Electronics.  Later, Paulraj founded three national-level research centers in India: the Center for Artificial Intelligence and Robotics, Defense R&D Organization, the Central Research Laboratories, Bharat Electronics, and the Center for Development of Advanced Computing, Dept. of Electronics (as co-founder). These labs are now a part of India's vast  R&D infrastructure. He retired prematurely from the Indian Navy in 1991 with a rank of Commodore

Career in USA 
Moving from India, Paulraj joined Stanford University faculty in 1992. His invention (1992) for exploiting multiple antennas at both ends of a wireless link (MIMO) lies at the heart of the current high speed WiFi and 4G and 5G mobile networks, and has revolutionized high-speed wireless services for billions of people.  MIMO boosts data rate by creating parallel data streams, multiplying throughput by the number of antennas used. He ran a MIMO research program at Stanford for two decades before retiring in 2010. He founded three companies: Iospan Wireless for MIMO-OFDMA core technology (acquired by Intel), and Beceem Communications for 4G chips (acquired by Broadcom), have helped create a wireless technology eco-system now shipping billions of MIMO wireless devices annually. He founded Rasa Networks (acquired by Aruba /HPE) for using AI tools in WiFi network analytics.

Paulraj has two textbooks on MIMO, over 400 archival research publications and a co-inventor in 80 patents.

Awards and honors 
 Elected into the American Academy of Arts and Sciences (AAAS) in 2020.
 Inducted into the US Patent Trademark Office  National Inventors Hall of Fame in 2018.
 Foreign Member Royal Swedish Academy of Engineering Sciences 
 Foreign Member Chinese Academy of Engineering
 The Padma Bhushan award by the Indian Government in 2010. 
 IEEE Alexander Graham Bell Medal in 2011.
 Marconi Prize and Fellowship in 2014. I
 Foreign Fellow Indian Academy of Sciences
 Foreign Fellow Indian National Science Academy
 Fellow of the Indian National Academy of Engineering
 Overseas Fellow National Academy of Sciences, India.
 Member United States National Academy of Engineering, elected in 2006.
 Fellow of the American Association for the Advancement of Science.
 Technical Achievement Award from the IEEE Signal Processing Society in 2003.
 Fellow of The World Academy for Sciences, elected in 2007.
 Fellow of the Institute of Electrical and Electronics Engineers (IEEE) since 1991.

References

External links
 Stanford page

Stanford University School of Engineering faculty
Living people
1944 births
People from Coimbatore
Indian Navy officers
Recipients of the Padma Bhushan in science & engineering
Tamil engineers
Members of the United States National Academy of Engineering
Foreign members of the Chinese Academy of Engineering
American people of Indian descent
20th-century Indian engineers
Engineers from Tamil Nadu